Courbillac is a commune in the Charente department in southwestern France. In 1886, Philippe Delamain, a merchant from Jarnac, discovered by chance a cemetery from the Merovingian period in Herpes near Courbillac. He found an outstanding collection of weapons, brooches, jewellery and vases dating from the time when the Franks had settled in Herpes (5th–7th centuries AD). His collection was dispersed soon after its discovery but a significant proportion is in the British Museum, London.

Population

See also
Communes of the Charente department

References

External links

 Website of the Commune of Courbillac

Communes of Charente